Hohenstein is a municipality in the Rheingau-Taunus-Kreis in the Regierungsbezirk of Darmstadt in Hesse, Germany.

Geography

Location
Hohenstein lies in the western Taunus, on both sides of the river Aar between Limburg and Wiesbaden.

Neighbouring communities
Hohenstein borders in the north on the community of Aarbergen, in the northeast on the community of Hünstetten, in the east and south on the town of Taunusstein, in the southwest on the town of Bad Schwalbach, and in the west on the community of Heidenrod (all in the Rheingau-Taunus-Kreis).

Constituent communities
Hohenstein’s Ortsteile are Breithardt (administrative seat), Burg-Hohenstein, Holzhausen über Aar, Strinz-Margarethä, Born, Hennethal and Steckenroth.

History
In 1184, Strinz-Margarethä had its first documentary mention, making it the earliest of Hohenstein’s constituent communities to have its name appear in the historical record. The other centres followed in the 13th and 14th centuries.

In the course of municipal reform in Hesse, the current greater community of Hohenstein was founded out of the formerly self-governing communities of Breithardt, Hohenstein, Holzhausen über Aar, Strinz-Margarethä, Born, Hennethal and Steckenroth on 1 July 1972. The constituent community of Hohenstein was thereafter known as Burg-Hohenstein (Burg means “castle” in German).

Politics

Community council

The municipal election held on 26 March 2006 yielded the following results:

Culture and sightseeing

Buildings
 At Hohenstein Castle (ruin), built about 1190 by the Counts of Katzenelnbogen and the Counts of Nassau-Laurenburg, are found a hotel and a restaurant.
 In the woods near Hennethal is found a late mediaeval border earthwork (wall-ditch complex), which was presumably built in the late 14th century to guard the Limburger Straße (road).

Regular events
 In the summer months there are theatrical productions on an open-air stage in the castle courtyard.
 Each year in late summer or early autumn, most constituent communities hold their traditional Kerb (kermis), which mostly have been organized by youth for several generations.
 Hohenstein Christmas Market

Economy and infrastructure
The centres in the community, whose livelihood was once based on agriculture, have built themselves into residential communities. There are the usual trades and businesses in Hohenstein, but no true industry.

Transport
Hohenstein lies on Bundesstraße 54 between Wiesbaden and Limburg.

Education
In the constituent community of Breithardt is a primary school. The nearest comprehensive schools are to be found in Aarbergen and Taunusstein. The latter offers a Gymnasium upper level. The nearest Gymnasium is likewise to be found in Taunusstein.

References

External links

 
 Community’s official webpage 

Rheingau-Taunus-Kreis